Cesare Pascarella (28 April 1858 - 8 May 1940), was an Italian dialect poet and a painter. He was appointed to the Royal Academy of Italy in 1930.

Pascarella was born in Rome and initially was a painter. His literary activity began in 1881 with the publication of sonnets in Romanesco dialect. In the same period he made friends with Gabriele D'Annunzio. He made a series of journeys through Africa, India and the Americas in 1882–1885. On his return to Rome he published the collection Villa Glori, who was hailed as a masterwork by Giosuè Carducci. Also well received was the imaginative La scoperta dell'America (1893).

In 1905 Pascarella began Storia nostra, a history of Rome which was planned as a sequence of 350 sonnets, but was left unfinished after 270 had been written.

He founded in 1904 with other artists, among which Giuseppe Ferrari, the group "XXV della campagna romana".

Pascarella's papers, his library, photographs, paintings and drawings were purchased by the Royal Academy of Italy (now Accademia Nazionale dei Lincei) in 1940. The body is entirely ordered.

Works 
 Er morto de campagna (1881, sonnets)
 La serenata (1883, sonnets)
 Er fattaccio (1884, sonnets)
 Villa Glori (1886, sonnets)
 Cose der monno  (1887)
 L'allustra scarpe (1887, philosophy)
 La scoperta dell'America (1893, sonnets)
 I sonetti (1900, sonnets)
 Le prose (1920, prose works)
 Viaggio in Ciociaria (1920)

Posthumous publications:
 Italia nostra
 Taccuini (published in 1961 by the Accademia dei Lincei)
 Storia nostra (published in 1961 by the Accademia dei Lincei)

See also
 Romanesco dialect

References

External links
 
 

1858 births
1940 deaths
19th-century Italian painters
Italian male painters
20th-century Italian painters
Painters from Rome
Members of the Royal Academy of Italy
Italian male poets
19th-century Italian male artists
20th-century Italian male artists